Fantastic Wilderlands Beyonde is a supplement for fantasy role-playing games published by Judges Guild in 1979. (JG 67)

Contents
Fantastic Wilderlands Beyonde is a campaign setting that describes the locations on four large wilderness maps (Wilderlands Maps 7-10).

The vast and dangerous wilderness regions of the Desert Lands (#7), Sea of Five Winds (#8), Elphand Lands (#9), and Lenap (#10) are shown in full detail on the judge's maps and are roughly sketched out on the players' maps. The booklet describes and gives the location of many of the villages, castles, islands, ruins, relics, and monsters.

Publication history
Fantastic Wilderlands Beyonde was written by Mark Holmer and Bob Bledsaw, and was published by Judges Guild in 1979 as a 32-page book, and four large maps.

Reception
Kurt Butterfield reviewed Fantastic Wilderlands Beyonde in The Space Gamer No. 33. Butterfield commented that "The graphics on the map are beautiful and highly detailed. Many of the encounter areas, ruins, and treasures are quite interesting and imaginative. The basic description of each village is very helpful and saves the judge a lot of preparation time." He continues: "The main problem ancountered in the maps is that the hex numbers are difficult to read at times. There are quite a few typos in the booklet and several examples of too much treasure given away for little or no risk." Butterfield concluded his review by saying, "The judge will have to add a large amount of detail and make a few changes to make the wilderness more interesting. He is given too little detail for too much money."

References

External links
 Judge's Guild Products by Title at acaeum.com.
 Fantastic Wilderlands Beyonde at acaeum.com.
 Wilderlands Campaign Maps at acaeum.com.
 City State Campaign - Judges Guild at waynesbooks.com.

Judges Guild fantasy role-playing game supplements
Role-playing game supplements introduced in 1979